Edward "Ed" Hatchett is an American attorney and politician from Glasgow, Kentucky. A Democrat, Hatchett was the elected State Auditor in Kentucky from 1995 to 2003.

Early life and education
Hatchett received his bachelor's degree from Centre College and Juris Doctor from the University of Louisville.

Career
Hatchett began practicing law in 1977. From 1977 to 1988 he was vice president, trust and investment officer and secretary of New Farmers National Bank of Glasgow. Hatchett has held various appointed positions in associated with Kentucky state government including, Kentucky Commissioner of Financial Institutions and Kentucky securities administrator.

Hatchett was elected Auditor of Public Accounts in Kentucky in 1995 and re-elected in 1999.

Currently, Hatchett practices law as managing partner for Blue Spring Creek, LLC.

Professional experience
Hatchett has had the following professional experience:
 Real Estate Broker, Hatchett Real Estate and Auction, 1977–present
 Auctioneer, Hatchett Auction, 1976–present
 President, United States Slag and ReClamation, 1978–1979
 Assistant Cashier, Bank of Marshall Company, 1971–1976

Personal life
Hatchett is currently married with three children; as well as two grandchildren.

Hatchett practices the religion of Christianity.

References

Year of birth missing (living people)
Living people
People from Glasgow, Kentucky
Centre College alumni
University of Louisville alumni
Kentucky lawyers
Kentucky Democrats
State Auditors of Kentucky